"Next Time You See Me" is a blues song written by Earl Forest and Bill Harvey, originally recorded in 1956 by Junior Parker (as "Little Junior Parker" as he was then known).  The song was Parker's first record chart appearance after joining Duke Records and one of his most successful singles in both the R&B and pop charts.  "Next Time You See Me" has been performed and recorded by various blues and other artists.

Composition and recording
"Next Time You See Me" is a mid-tempo twelve-bar blues shuffle with breaks. It features Parker's smooth vocal propelled by a horn-driven rhythm section. As with most of Junior Parker's songs, it is "more melodic than the average blues". Singer and music writer Billy Vera described Parker's approach: 
The horn section includes band leader Bill Harvey on tenor sax, Harvey Joe Scott on trumpet, Pluma Davis on trombone, along with Connie McBooker on piano, Pat Hare on guitar, Hamp Simmons on bass, and Sonny Freeman on drums. 
The song begins with a chorus:

Releases and charts
In 1957, Duke Records released "Next Time You See Me" as a single, backed with "My Dolly Bee".  It reached number five on Billboard's R&B chart as well as reaching number 74 on its broader Hot 100. The song is included on several Parker compilations, such as Junior's Blues: The Duke Recordings, Vol. 1 (1992).

References

1956 songs
1957 singles
Blues songs
Junior Parker songs
Grateful Dead songs
Duke Records singles
Pacific Gas & Electric (band) songs